Dorstenia peltata is a plant species in the family Moraceae which is native to the Dominican Republic and Cuba.

References

peltata
Plants described in 1822
Flora of Cuba
Flora of the Dominican Republic
Flora without expected TNC conservation status